Colin Stibe (22 April 1916 – 6 January 1970) was an Australian cricketer. He played in three first-class matches for Queensland between 1938 and 1940.

See also
 List of Queensland first-class cricketers

References

External links
 

1916 births
1970 deaths
Australian cricketers
Queensland cricketers
Sportspeople from Bundaberg
Cricketers from Queensland